The Australasian Martial Arts Hall of Fame is an award for Australian martial art practitioners of any style, The hall of fame recognizes those who make an outstanding contribution to martial arts, consistently demonstrate excellence and unselfishly promote the growth of martial arts.

2019 inductees

2018 inductees

2017 inductees

2016 inductees

2016 award ceremony 
Terry Lim was a lifetime achievement award recipient for running martial arts tournaments 3 times per year for the last 3 decades, and over 3,000 students having trained at his academy. Lim demonstrated his abilities during the induction ceremony in Adelaide by bending a two-meter metal rod with his throat, then he was struck with a sledge hammer breaking three concrete roof tiles on his back.

2015 inductees

2014 inductees

See also

 List of halls and walks of fame

References

External links

Martial arts in Australia
Sports halls of fame
Halls of fame in Australia
Awards established in 1996
1996 establishments in Australia